Arseneault is a French surname. Notable people with the surname include:

David Arseneault (born 1953), college basketball coach
David Arseneault Jr. (born 1986), Canadian professional and college basketball coach, former player
Donald Arseneault, Canadian politician
Guy Arseneault (born 1952), Canadian politician
Louise Arseneault, psychology professor at King's College London
Raynald Arseneault (1945–1995), Canadian composer and organist

See also

Arsenault
Arseneau
Arceneaux
 

French-language surnames